Dimitri Edou Nzue (born 4 April 1986) is a Gabonese striker with US Bitam.

Career
He was formerly a member of FC 105 Libreville from 1999 to 2004 and Sogéa FC.

International career
Nzue also competes on the Gabon national football team.

References

1986 births
Living people
Gabonese footballers
FC 105 Libreville players
US Monastir (football) players
Gabonese expatriate sportspeople in Tunisia
Association football forwards
Gabon international footballers
Gabonese expatriate footballers
Expatriate footballers in Tunisia
21st-century Gabonese people